Richard Kotz (12 September 1886 – 8 June 1960) was a highly decorated Generalmajor in the Wehrmacht during World War II. He was also a recipient of the Knight's Cross of the Iron Cross. The Knight's Cross of the Iron Cross was awarded to recognise extreme battlefield bravery or successful military leadership. Richard Kotz was captured by American troops in May 1945 and was held until January 1947.

Awards and decorations
 Iron Cross (1914)
 2nd Class
 1st Class
 Prussian Golden Military Merit Cross on 3 May 1918 as deputy officer in the 4. Garde-Regiment zu Fuß
 Honour Cross of the World War 1914/1918
 Iron Cross (1939)
 2nd Class
 1st Class
 Eastern Front Medal
 German Cross in Gold (13 January 1943)
 Knight's Cross of the Iron Cross on 21 October 1943 as Oberst and commander of Grenadier-Regiment 389

Notes

References

External links
TracesOfWar.com

1886 births
1960 deaths
Major generals of the German Army (Wehrmacht)
German Army personnel of World War I
People from the Province of Saxony
Recipients of the clasp to the Iron Cross, 1st class
Recipients of the Gold German Cross
Recipients of the Knight's Cross of the Iron Cross
German prisoners of war in World War II held by the United States
Prussian Army personnel
German Army generals of World War II